Abakumovskaya is a rural locality (a village) in Nizhne-Vazhskoye Rural Settlement of Verkhovazhsky District, Vologda Oblast, Russia. The population was 20 as of 2002.

Geography 
Abakumovskaya is located 5 km northeast of Verkhovazhye (the district's administrative centre) by road. Ruchyevskaya is the nearest rural locality.

References 

Rural localities in Verkhovazhsky District